Plum Lake is a natural lake in Kingsbury County, South Dakota, in the United States.

Plum Lake received its name from the plum trees which lined the lake.

See also
List of lakes in South Dakota

References

Lakes of South Dakota
Lakes of Kingsbury County, South Dakota